The N56 road is a national secondary road in the Republic of Ireland that runs from Donegal Town clockwise to Letterkenny. As originally designated, it included the section of the N13 between Stranorlar and Letterkenny, forming a circular route including parts of the N15.

The route runs through the Gaeltacht in north-western County Donegal, forming a main coastal route in Ulster.

The road bypasses Donegal Town and Mountcharles at the southern end of the route, and skirts the edge of Letterkenny at the eastern end. Significant upgrade work began construction between 2012 and 2019 to upgrade the bulk of the route between Donegal Town and Dungloe in two separate schemes; from Mountcharles to Inver and from Glenties to Dungloe. It is proposed to bypass Dunkineely in a future stage of work from Inver to Killybegs in the Donegal County Development Plan

See also
Roads in Ireland
Motorways in Ireland
National primary road
Regional road

References

Roads Act 1993 (Classification of National Roads) Order 2006– Department of Transport

National secondary roads in the Republic of Ireland
Roads in County Donegal